Lärchenberg (330.8 m) is a mountain of Saxony, Germany. It's located in the Upper Lusatian Highlands, southwest of Löbau.

Mountains of Saxony